IUR may refer to :
 Islamic University of Rotterdam, a vocational university in the Netherlands
 International University of Rabat, a public-contracted private university in Morocco
 Inuit Uukturausingit, an Indigenous sign language isolate native to Inuit communities of the Eastern Arctic